The South Lake Morton Historic District is a U.S. historic district (designated as such on November 20, 1985) located in Lakeland, Florida. It received its designation because it provides an outstanding example of urban planning from the early 20th century, and because of the large number of architecturally significant structures ranging from 1920- 1948.  It contains 557 historic buildings. Most of the homes are bungalows from the Arts and Crafts period of the 1920s and 30s.  There are also examples of Victorian, Queen Anne, and Spanish Revival homes. The district is bounded by Lake Morton Drive and Palmetto Street, Ingraham Avenue, Johnson Avenue, Frank Lloyd Wright Way (formerly McDonald Street,) Belmar Street, and Tennessee Avenue.

References

External links

 Polk County listings at National Register of Historic Places

Lakeland, Florida
National Register of Historic Places in Polk County, Florida
Historic districts on the National Register of Historic Places in Florida
1985 establishments in Florida